Emotionalists is a group of artists founded as an artistic movement
in 1994
 by sculptor, painter and
designer of the Polish School of Industrial Design, and professor
emeritus at University of Bridgeport, Lubomir Tomaszewski.
The group has as its mission the return to the natural language of
expression in art and seeks to awaken deep emotions in the viewer and
communicate: “Less show, more content”. The philosophy of this movement
is also a reaction to the "over-intellectualized" modern art and its loss
of emotion and mood, which its considers one of the most important factors
for the artist as well as the viewer. Because of this, the artist looks to
tradition and "lasting values" in art, vehemently condemning
experimentation and simplification or geometrization for the sole purpose
of surprising or shocking the viewer.  The spectrum of the works is broad,
ranging from figurative to
conceptual. It's a multi-disciplinary group, associating painters,
sculptors, illustrators, photographers, graphic artists, textile designers,
dancers, and musicians

References

American artist groups and collectives